Fungus pockets are any of various convergently evolved inoculum-retention and -cultivation organs in a wide range of insect taxa. They are generally divided into mycangia (or "mycetangia") and infrabuccal pockets.

Fungus pockets are found in ambrosia beetles, bark beetles, termites and attine ants.

References

Insect morphology
Mycology
Symbiosis